Anubis subobtusus is a species of longhorn beetles belonging to the family Cerambycidae.

Description
Head, pronotum and elytra are bright green with yellow transversal bands on elytra, sometimes lined with blue.

Distribution
This species can be found in Thailand and Viet Nam.

References

Callichromatini
Beetles described in 1932